The 1980 Volta a Catalunya was the 60th edition of the Volta a Catalunya cycle race and was held from 3 September to 10 September 1980. The race started in Sant Carles de la Ràpita and finished at L'Hospitalet. The race was won by Marino Lejarreta of the Teka team.

General classification

References

1980
Volta
1980 in Spanish road cycling
September 1980 sports events in Europe